Mycolaelaps is a genus of mites in the family Ascidae.

Species
 Mycolaelaps maxinae Lindquist, 1995

References

Ascidae